Schaffhouse-sur-Zorn (Alsatian: Schàffhüse) is a former commune in the Bas-Rhin department in Grand Est in north-eastern France. On 1 January 2017, it was merged into the commune Hochfelden.

See also
 Communes of the Bas-Rhin department

References

Former communes of Bas-Rhin
Populated places disestablished in 2017